Serai Niamat Khan (or Sarai Naimat Khan) is one of the 44 union councils of the Haripur District in the Khyber Pakhtunkhwa province of Pakistan.  Sarai Naimat Khan is divided into smaller areas including Mohallah Khu, Jora Pind, Moriyan, Najeeb Abad, and Mohalla Ziarat.

Economy 

Sarai Naimat Khan is a local economic hub surrounding villages. It is about 15 km (9.3 mi) from Haripur District.

The primary source of income is agriculture. However, due to a lack of water and other resources, in recent years, several residents have moved into larger cities to find other jobs such as factory work, taxi drivers, barber, or laborers etc.

Transport 
Serai Niamat Khan is also connected to Havelian, which is about 27 km (16.8 mi) away. Means of transport is by road and most people travel via local buses, pickups or vans.

Education 
Government and private sector schools operate in the town. Students from surrounding villages come to these schools with a significant number of students going to the nearby city of Haripur.

Two schools are in operation which consist of an all-boys and an all-girls school.

Health care 
A small government hospital provides health care. Private practice health clinics are present. 

United Bank and Muslim Commercial Bank have offices located there.

Demographics 
Most of the people living there belong to the Tanoli, Lodhi, Raja, Awan, Gakhar, or Turks tribes.

Religion 
The population is predominantly Muslim. A Jamia mosque occupies the town center.

Climate 
Serai Niamat Khan has a weather characterized with no dry season and a hot summer. The rainiest months are July and August, and summer highs reach over 90°F in Fahrenheit (32.2°C). Sunlight hours stay similar throughout the year. The Köppen Climate Classification subtype for this climate is "Cfa" (humid subtropical climate).

References 

 Union councils of Haripur District
 All articles needing copy edit